The Ferrari 156 was a racing car made by Ferrari in 1961 to comply with then-new Formula One regulations that reduced engine displacement from 2.5- to 1.5-litres, similar to the pre-1961 Formula Two class for which Ferrari had developed a mid-engined car also called 156 F2.

Phil Hill won the 1961 World Championship of Drivers and Ferrari secured the 1961 International Cup for F1 Manufacturers, both victories achieved with the 156.

Development

Sharknose

The 1961 version was affectionately dubbed "sharknose" due to its characteristic air intake "nostrils". Ferrari factory policy saw all the remaining sharknose 156s scrapped by the end of the 1963 season. Nevertheless, such a 156 is exhibited in the "Galleria Ferrari" at Maranello, probably a replica. A similar intake duct styling was applied to the five SP-series Ferraris in 1961 and 1962 that were also designed by Carlo Chiti, and then again over forty years later to the Ferrari F430.

Ferrari started the season with a 65-degree Dino engine, then replaced by a new engine with the V-angle increased to 120-degrees and designed by Carlo Chiti. A V-6 engine with 120-degree bank is smoother at producing power because every 120-degree rotation of engine crankshaft produces a power pulse. At the 1962 British Grand Prix, Phil Hill raced a new version with a six-speed transmission mounted in front of the engine. In August, at the German Grand Prix, Lorenzo Bandini tested a non-sharknose variant with modified front and rear suspension and a smaller radiator, heralding the 156 Aero used in 1963.

1963 Ferrari 156 Aero
The updated Ferrari 156, used in the 1963 and 1964 seasons, did not feature the distinctive sharknose design. but had a rather conventional intake, somewhat larger than the Ferrari 158 introduced in 1964.

In 1963 the 120° V6 employed Bosch direct-fuel injection instead of carburetors and output increased to 147 kW (197 hp). The last victory for the Ferrari 156 was achieved by Italian Lorenzo Bandini in the 1964 Austrian Grand Prix.

Monza crash
On September 10, 1961, after a collision with Jim Clark's Lotus on the second lap of the Italian Grand Prix, the 156 of Wolfgang von Trips (Hill's teammate) became airborne and crashed into a side barrier, fatally throwing him from the car and killing fifteen spectators.

Famous drivers
Phil Hill
Wolfgang von Trips
Richie Ginther
Willy Mairesse
Olivier Gendebien
Giancarlo Baghetti
Ricardo Rodríguez
Lorenzo Bandini
John Surtees
Ludovico Scarfiotti
Pedro Rodríguez

In popular culture
 English Blues singer-songwriter Chris Rea had a meticulous replica of the sharknose built for him to use in his 1996 film, La Passione.

Complete Formula One World Championship results
(key) (results in bold indicate pole position; results in italics indicate fastest lap)

References

156 F1
Formula One championship-winning cars